Pedamallam is a village in West Godavari district in the state of Andhra Pradesh in India.

Demographics
 India census, Pedamallam has a population of 3278 of which 1696 are males while 1582 are females. The average sex ratio of Pedamallam village is 933. The child population is 303, which makes up 9.24% of the total population of the village, with sex ratio 894. In 2011, the literacy rate of Pedamallam village was 75.16% when compared to 67.02% of Andhra Pradesh.

See also 
 West Godavari district

References 

Villages in West Godavari district